Hyunsoonleella pacifica is a Gram-negative, strictly aerobic and non-motile bacterium from the genus of Hyunsoonleella which has been isolated from seawater from the South Pacific Gyre.

References 

Flavobacteria
Bacteria described in 2015